Music to Ease Your Disease is an album by jazz pianist Horace Silver, his fifth and final release on the Silverto label, featuring performances by Silver with Clark Terry, Junior Cook, Ray Drummond, and Billy Hart, with vocals by Andy Bey.

Reception
The Allmusic review by Scott Yanow awarded the album 3 stars and states: "Horace Silver has long been a believer in the self-help holistic movement and this has been reflected in the lyrics he has written during the past decade... However there are plenty of strong instrumental moments from an all-star quintet that includes pianist Silver, fluegelhornist Clark Terry, tenor-saxophonist Junior Cook, bassist Ray Drummond and drummer Billy Hart, and for that reason this is the strongest release on Silverto to date."

Track listing 
All compositions and lyrics by Horace Silver
 "Prologue"
 "Hangin' Loose"
 "The Respiratory Story"
 "Tie Your Dreams to a Star"
 "Music to Ease Your Disease"
 "The Philanthropic View"
 "What is the Sinus Minus"
 "Epilogue"
 Recorded in New York City on March 31, 1988.

Personnel 
 Horace Silver - piano
 Clark Terry - trumpet, flugelhorn
 Junior Cook - tenor saxophone
 Ray Drummond - bass
 Billy Hart - drums
 Andy Bey - vocals

References 

Horace Silver albums
Silverto Records albums
1988 albums